Hanford is a Welsh surname..  Notable people with this surname include:
 Thomas Hanford (1621–1693), Founder of Norwalk, Connecticut
 Benjamin Hanford (1861–1910), American politician
 Burke Hanford (1872–1928), United States Navy sailor and Medal of Honor recipient
 Charles B. Hanford (1859–1926), American stage actor
 Charlie Hanford (1882–1963), American baseball player
 Cornelius H. Hanford (1849–1926), American judge
 Dan Hanford (born 1991), Welsh footballer
  Deirdre Hanford, American business executive, a VIP at Synopsys, Inc
 Frank Hanford (1853–1921), American politician and businessman
 Harry Hanford (1907–1996), Welsh footballer 
 Henry Hanford (1784–1866), American pioneer
 James Madison Hanford (1827–1911), American railroad executive
 Jamie Hanford (b. 1975), American lacrosse player
 John Hanford (born ), American ambassador
 Martin Hanford (born 1974), British fantasy artist
 Thaddeus Hanford (1847–1892), American editor

See also 
Handford, a surname

References

Surnames
Surnames of Welsh origin
Surnames of British Isles origin